The City of Auckland Classic was a golf tournament held in New Zealand from 1971 to 1976.

History 
The tournament was part of the PGA of New Zealand circuit. The event was hosted by The Grange Golf Club in Auckland. In 1975, however, the New Zealand Airlines Classic was played at The Grange and the City of Auckland Classic was not held that year.

Winners

1 Reduced to 54 holes after the first day was abandoned because of rain.

References

Golf tournaments in New Zealand
Recurring sporting events established in 1971
Recurring events disestablished in 1976
1971 establishments in New Zealand
1976 disestablishments in New Zealand